Bennettiodendron cordatum is a species of plant in the family Salicaceae. It is endemic to Vietnam.

References

Flora of Vietnam
cordatum
Vulnerable plants
Taxonomy articles created by Polbot